The Azeri Stakes is a Grade II American Thoroughbred horse race for fillies and mares that are four years old or older, over a distance of one and one-sixteenth miles on the dirt track held annually in March at Oaklawn Park in Hot Springs, Arkansas.  The event currently carries a purse of $350,000.

History 

The inaugural running of the event was on 3 April 1987 as the Oaklawn Budweiser Breeders' Cup Handicap with sponsorship for Budweiser and the Breeders' Cup.  The event was won by North Sider who was ridden by US Hall of Fame jockey Angel Cordero Jr. and trained by US Hall of Fame trainer D. Wayne Lukas in a time of 1:42. North Sider later that year would capture US Champion Older Female Horse.

The event was upgraded to a Grade III event in 1990 but was downgraded back to Listed in 1995 for five runnings.

Budweiser continued sponsoring the event until 1995 while the Breeders' Cup sponsored the event until 2007 which reflected in the name of the event.

The event was renamed Azeri Stakes in 2005 to honor Azeri, the American Horse of the Year of 2002, and the American Champion Older Female Horse three years running: 2002, 2003, and 2004.

This race was upgraded to a Grade II for its 2014 running.

Several notable winners went on to become champions. The 2011 winner Havre de Grace would later defeat males in the GI Woodward Stakes and be crowned 2011 American Horse of the Year. The 2019 winner Midnight Bisou continued with her brilliant form to capture US Champion Older Female Horse honors.

Records
Speed record:
 1:42.01 – Sister Act (1999)

Margins:
 lengths – Serengeti Empress (2020)

Most wins:
 2 –  Halo America  (1995, 1997)
 2 – Heritage of Gold (2000, 2001)
 2 – Tiz Miz Sue (2012, 2013)

Most wins by a jockey:
 3 – Calvin Borel (1997, 1999, 2010)
 3 –  Joseph Rocco Jr.  (2012, 2013, 2016)

Most wins by a trainer:
 4 – D. Wayne Lukas (1987, 1991, 1992, 2023)

Most wins by an owner:
 3 – John A. Franks (1994, 1995, 1997)

Winners

Notes:

§ Ran as an entry

See also
List of American and Canadian Graded races

External sites
Oaklawn Park Media Guide 2021

References

Graded stakes races in the United States
Grade 2 stakes races in the United States
Horse races in Arkansas
Mile category horse races for fillies and mares
Flat horse races for four-year-old fillies
Recurring sporting events established in 1987
1987 establishments in Arkansas